Clear Mobile is a mobile telephone network running as a mobile virtual network operator (MVNO) using Vodafone's Irish network. Clear Mobile is owned by Vodafone. Clear Mobile was launched on 14 January 2021.

Products and services 
Since launch, Clear Mobile has offered one product, which is a sim-only mobile contract. The package is post-paid and includes unlimited calls to Irish mobiles and landlines, unlimited texts to Irish mobiles, unlimited 4G data with a maximum download speed of 5Mbit/s and 10GB EU data.

Customer service 
Clear Mobile has no customer service phone lines. All support is via social media and online channels.

References 

Telecommunications
Irish companies established in 2021
Mobile virtual network operators
Mobile telecommunications networks